Petromus is a genus of hystricognath rodents that contains the dassie rat (Petromus typicus) of southwestern Africa, the only extant member of this group and the entire family Petromuridae.

Two fossil species are known from the Pliocene, with the oldest being Petromus antiquus of the Early Pliocene.

References

Hystricognath rodents
Rodent genera
Mammal genera with one living species
Taxa named by Andrew Smith (zoologist)